The Fascist Civil and Military Order of the Roman Eagle founded in 1942 with civil and military divisions, was abolished in Italy in 1944; although it continued to be awarded by Benito Mussolini in the short-lived Italian Social Republic until 1945. A self-styled order of the same name was founded by Romano Mussolini, fourth and youngest son of Benito Mussolini, in 1997.

Degrees
The various degrees of the order, with corresponding ribbons, were as follows:

The separate Order of the Patron Saints of Italy (Ordine dei Santi Patroni d'Italia), St. Francis of Assisi and St. Catherine of Siena, was also conferred by the so-called Republic of Salò between February and April 1945. An organisation of this name was also founded by Romano Mussolini in 1997.

Recipients 

 Karl von Eberstein
 Fritz Frauenheim
 Arthur Laumann
 Victor Emmanuel III of Italy

See also
List of Italian orders of knighthood
Colonial Order of the Star of Italy

External links
Ordine dell'Aquila Romana 
Ordine dei Santi Patroni d'Italia

References

Italian Fascism
Roman Eagle, Order of the
Italian Social Republic
1942 establishments in Italy
1945 disestablishments in Italy
Roman Eagle, Order of the
Roman Eagle, Order of the
Military awards and decorations of Italy